The 2018 belairdirect BC Men's Curling Championship was held from January 30 to February 4 at the Parksville Curling Club in Parksville, British Columbia. The winning Sean Geall rink represented British Columbia at the 2018 Tim Hortons Brier in Regina, Saskatchewan.

Teams
The teams are listed as follows:

Knockout Draw Brackets
The draw is listed as follows:

A Event

B Event

C Event

Playoffs

A vs. B
Saturday, February 3, 2:00 pm

C1 vs. C2
Saturday, February 3, 7:00 pm

Semifinal
Sunday, February 4, 11:00 am

Final
Sunday, February 4, 4:00 pm

References

2018 Tim Hortons Brier
2018 in British Columbia
Curling in British Columbia
February 2018 sports events in Canada
Parksville, British Columbia
January 2018 sports events in Canada